Among the pollinating insects of New Zealand are numerous species of the Syrphidae or hoverfly family.

Syrphid flies

There are more than 40 species of Syrphid flies in New Zealand. As is the case outside of New Zealand, the family is extremely variable, ranging from large, bulky, and hairy to the small, slender, and shiny. These flies are found in a variety of habitats including agricultural fields and alpine zones. Two hoverfly species in Switzerland are being investigated for introduction as biological control agents of hawkweeds in New Zealand.

Syrphid flies, in particular the native species Melanostoma fasciatum and Melangyna novaezelandiae, are common on agricultural fields in New Zealand. Coriander and tansy leaf are known to be particularly attractive to many species of adult hoverflies which feed on large quantities of pollen of these plants. In organic paddocks hoverflies were found to feed on an average of three and a maximum of six different pollen types. M. fasciatum has a short proboscis which restricts it to obtaining nectar from disk flowers.

Syrphid flies are also common visitors to flowers in alpine zones in New Zealand. Native flies (Allograpta and Platycheirus) in alpine zones show preferences for flower species based on their colour in alpine zones; syrphid flies consistently choose yellow flowers over white regardless of species. However, syrphid flies are not as effective pollinators of alpine herb species as native solitary bees.

References

 
Hoverflies
Pollination